In Greek mythology, Euryalus was a young Phaeacian nobleman and son of Naubolous.

Mythology 
In the Odyssey, Homer gives him the epithet "the peer of murderous Ares". Next to Laodamas, he is said to be the most handsome of the Phaeacians, and is the best wrestler. He convinces Laodamas to challenge Odysseus, then rebukes him when he refuses to participate, saying "No truly, stranger, nor do I think thee at all like one that is skilled in games, whereof there are many among men, rather art thou such an one as comes and goes in a benched ship, a master of sailors that are merchantmen, one with a memory for his freight, or that hath the charge of a cargo homeward bound, and of greedily gotten gains; thou seemest not a man of thy hands." When King Alcinous orders him to make amends, he gives Odysseus a bronze sword with a silver hilt and an ivory sheath.

Notes 

Characters in Greek mythology

Reference 

 Homer, The Odyssey with an English Translation by A.T. Murray, PH.D. in two volumes. Cambridge, MA., Harvard University Press; London, William Heinemann, Ltd. 1919. . Online version at the Perseus Digital Library. Greek text available from the same website.